Reviewing the Situation is the fifth original album by 1960s British singer Sandie Shaw. Released in late 1969 by Pye Records, it contained material very different from that which pop-lovers were accustomed to hearing from Shaw. This was Shaw's first time producing an album herself and she chose to cover songs made popular by more alternative artists who she felt had had a big impact on the music of the 1960s.

Track listing

Personnel
Sandie Shaw – vocals
Geoff Peach – tenor saxophone, flute, vocals
Rodney Hill – guitar
Brent Pickthall – bass guitar, backing vocals
Ian Wallace – drums

References

1969 albums
Sandie Shaw albums
Pye Records albums